Randolph Weatherbee (December 9, 1907 - May 20, 1976) was an American lawyer and judge who served as the 80th Associate Justice of the Maine Supreme Court from 1966 to 1976.

Biography 
Randolph Weatherbee was born in Portland. He graduated from Bates College, in Lewiston, Maine with a Bachelor of Arts in 1932.

References 

Bates College alumni
1907 births
1976 deaths
People from Portland, Maine
20th-century American judges
20th-century American lawyers
Justices of the Maine Supreme Judicial Court